Bogdan Cătălin Gavrilă (born 6 February 1992) is a Romanian professional footballer who plays as a winger.

Club career
At youth level Gavrilă played for important names in Italy like Roma or Lecce and at senior level he played in Liga I for Oțelul Galați, Dinamo București, Petrolul Ploiești and Politehnica Iași, in Cyprus for Ethnikos Achna and in Malta for Sirens.

Honours

Club
Valletta
Maltese Premier League: 2018–19

Oțelul Galați
Liga III: 2020–21

References

External links
 
 

1992 births
Living people
Sportspeople from Galați
Romanian footballers
Association football midfielders
FCM Dunărea Galați players
A.S. Roma players
U.S. Lecce players
Liga I players
Liga II players
Liga III players
AFC Chindia Târgoviște players
ASC Oțelul Galați players
FC Dinamo București players
FC Petrolul Ploiești players
FC Politehnica Iași (2010) players
FC Gloria Buzău players
Cypriot First Division players
Ethnikos Achna FC players
Maltese Premier League players
Valletta F.C. players
Sirens F.C. players
Romanian expatriate footballers
Romanian expatriate sportspeople in Italy
Expatriate footballers in Italy
Romanian expatriate sportspeople in Cyprus
Expatriate footballers in Cyprus
Romanian expatriate sportspeople in Malta
Expatriate footballers in Malta